Achraf Achaoui (born 10 December 1996) is a Belgian-born Moroccan professional footballer who currently plays as a left-back for Olympic Charleroi Châtelet Farciennes.

Professional career
Achaoui made his senior debut in a 4–1 win over Royal Excel Mouscron.

On 7 May 2019, Achaoui joined Belgian club Olympic Charleroi Châtelet Farciennes.

International career
Achaoui was born in Belgium to parents of Moroccan descent. Achaoui made 4 appearances for the Morocco U17s in the 2013 FIFA U-17 World Cup. Achaoui was called up and capped for the Morocco U23s in a friendly 1–0 win against the Cameroon U23s.

References

External links
 Soccerway Profile

1996 births
Living people
Moroccan footballers
Morocco youth international footballers
Belgian footballers
Belgian sportspeople of Moroccan descent
Standard Liège players
Roda JC Kerkrade players
Belgian Pro League players
Association football fullbacks
Expatriate footballers in the Netherlands